Halley is a lunar impact crater that is intruding into the southern wall of the walled plain Hipparchus. Its diameter is 35 km. The crater is named after the English astronomer Edmond Halley. On the 1645 map by Michael van Langren, the crater is called Gansii, for the gansa (a kind of wild swan) of Francis Godwins The Man in the Moone. To the southwest of Halley is the large crater Albategnius, and due east lies the slightly smaller Hind.

The rim of Halley is somewhat worn, the east being scoured by debris from the Imbrium basin, hence forming part of the Imbrium Scultpure. The interior floor of Halley is relatively flat, being filled with material of the same albedo of the surrounding terrain, and is probably melt from the Imbrium impact.

Satellite craters

By convention these features are identified on lunar maps by placing the letter on the side of the crater midpoint that is closest to Halley.

References

Further reading

External links

Halley at The Moon Wiki
 LTO-77C2 Halley — L&PI topographic map

Related article
 

Impact craters on the Moon